Ljubovija is a small town and municipality located in the Mačva District of western Serbia. As of 2011, the population of the municipality is 14,469 inhabitants.

Settlements
Aside from the town of Ljubovija, the municipality includes the following settlements:

 Berlovine
 Vrhpolje
 Gornja Ljuboviđa
 Gornja Orovica
 Gornja Trešnjica
 Gornje Košlje
 Gračanica
 Grčić
 Donja Ljuboviđa
 Donja Orovica
 Drlače
 Duboko
 Leović
 Lonjin
 Orovička Planina
 Podnemić
 Postenje
 Rujevac
 Savković
 Selenac
 Sokolac
 Tornik
 Uzovnica
 Caparić
 Crnča
 Čitluk

Demographics

According to the 2011 census results, the municipality of Ljubovija has 14,469 inhabitants.

Ethnic groups
The ethnic composition of the municipality:

Economy
The following table gives a preview of total number of employed people per their core activity (as of 2017):

Notable people
 Dragana Stanković, basketball player, Olympic bronze medalist
 Nenad Sević, football player
 Petar Radojičić, basketball player
 Branko Lazić, basketball player
 Nenad Okanović, actor
 Slaviša Pavlović, writer

See also
 Podrinje

References

External links 

 
Populated places in Mačva District
Municipalities and cities of Šumadija and Western Serbia